Small ball may refer to:

 Small ball (baseball)
 Small ball (basketball)